Charles Gill may refer to:

 Charles-Ignace Gill (1844–1901), Canadian Member of Parliament
 Charles Gill (artist) (1871–1918), Canadian painter and poet
 Charles O. Gill (1868–1959), American college football coach
 Charlie Gill (1923–1986), Australian rugby league footballer
 Charles Lovett Gill (1880–1960), Scottish architect
 Charles R. Gill (1830–1883), politician in the state of Wisconsin
 Charles Hope Gill (1861–1946), bishop of Travancore and Cochin